This is a list of international presidential trips made by George H. W. Bush, the 41st president of the United States. George H. W. Bush made 26 international trips to 58 different countries on six continents—Africa, Asia, Australia, Europe, North America, and South America—during  his presidency, which began on January 20, 1989 and ended on January 20, 1993.

Summary
The number of visits per country where President Bush travelled are:
 One visit to Argentina, Australia, Chile, China, Colombia, Costa Rica, Czechoslovakia, Egypt, Greece, Hungary, Malta, Martinique, Mexico, Panama, Russia, Saint Martin, Singapore, Somalia, Soviet Union, Spain, Switzerland, Turkey, Uruguay and Venezuela
 Two visits to Belgium, Bermuda, Brazil, Finland, Italy, Japan, Netherlands, Poland, South Korea and Vatican City
 Three visits to Germany, Saudi Arabia and the United Kingdom
 Four visits to Canada and France

1989

1990

1991

1992–1993

Multilateral meetings
Multilateral meetings of the following intergovernmental organizations took place during President Bush's term in office (1989–1993).

See also
 Foreign policy of the George H. W. Bush administration
 Foreign policy of the United States

References

External links
 Travels of President George H. W. Bush. U.S. Department of State Office of the Historian.

Presidency of George H. W. Bush
20th century in international relations
1980s politics-related lists
1990s politics-related lists
Bush, George H. W., international
George H. W. Bush-related lists